Forsgren or Forsgrén is a surname. Notable people with the surname include:

Bella Forsgrén (born 1992), Finnish politician
John E. Forsgren (1816–1890), Swedish Mormon pioneer and missionary
Nicole Forsgren, American technology executive, entrepreneur, and author
Lyle and Dale Forsgren, American builders of Forsgrini race cars